Antenna, better known as ANT1, is a free-to-air television network airing in Greece. The alternate spelling is wordplay in Greek; ena (ένα) is the Greek number 1 (one), thus ANT1 is pronounced the same as Antenna (Αντέννα). It launched on 31 December 1989, and is owned by Antenna Group. ANT1 had been a popular network in Greece for years with its line up of soap series including dramas Lampsi and Kalimera Zoi.

History
The first broadcast of the channel was on 31 December 1989. Antenna Group also runs Easy 97.2 and Rythmos 94.9 in Athens, as well as international networks ANT1 Satellite (from America), ANT1 Pacific (from Australia) and ANT1 Europe which broadcast the best of ANT1 programming to audiences abroad. It also owns a stake in Makedonia TV also with national coverage in Greece, and through third parties Easy 97.5 based in Thessaloniki.

Programs that were once shown on ANT1 include CBS Evening News from the U.S. ANT1 Satellite News was also shown until the late 1990s. Antenna TV studios are located in the Athens suburb of Marousi. The station broadcasts terrestrially via a network of repeaters throughout all of Greece and Cyprus.

Antenna is led by Theodore Kyriakou. He served as Executive Vice President of the Antenna Group S.A. (from 1995) and as Chief Operating Officer (from September 1998) until his appointment in March 1999 as Chief Executive Officer, a position which he held until his appointment in January 2002 as Group Vice Chairman. Mr. Kyriakou has been a Director since September 1998.

ANT1 International channels
Since 1993, Antenna has broadcast its programming internationally for Greek-speaking audiences abroad. Initially, the broadcast was for a few hours each day but since 2000 has evolved into a full channel that operates twenty-four hours a day. ANT1 currently operates three television channels, via satellite, which vary according to the different geographical targets:

Antenna Europe for audiences in Europe (outside Greece and Cyprus) which has been operating since 2006.
Antenna Pacific for audiences in Australia which has been operating since 1997.
Antenna Satellite for audiences in America which has been operating since 1993.

ANT1 HD
ANT1 began broadcasting in high definition (HD) by the evening of March 1, 2016. The program is transmitted as the normal broadcast and at the frequency of simple definition, but the parent (native HD) broadcast only emits what has been shot with this resolution.

In 2010, Antenna Group has launched on-demand Internet media service Netwix, available to viewers in Greece. It mainly includes short Youtube-style comedy videos created by famous greek comedians.

ANT1+
Since April 2022, Antenna Group has launched its own subscription-based streaming media, which includes some original shows such as "Serres" and "I Gefyra (The Bridge)", along with many movies and foreign television series.

Controversy
In July 2022, following the assassination of Shinzo Abe, a news segment on ANT1 TV Greece shared the same images of Hideo Kojima, identifying him as the alleged killer. ANT1 TV Greece took down the video on Friday, but the story caused major controversy as it became viral globally. The mistake first started going viral after French far-right politician Damien Rieu tweeted pictures of Kojima in response to another politician’s tweet about the assassination. The 4chan post used a photo of Kojima and falsely labelled him as a "left-wing extremist" with a criminal record. In response, Hideo Kojima threatened to sue over false posts, stating that he "strongly condemns the spread of fake news and rumours that convey false information".

Slogans
ANT1 has had various slogans over the years including:

from 1989 until 1998: "ΑΝΤ1-Νούμερο Ένα" ("ANT1-The Number One")
from 1998 until 2000: "Όλα για σένα" ("All for you")
2000 – 2001 season: "Βλέπεις με την καρδιά σου" ("You're watching with your heart")
2001 – 2002 season: "Καλύτερα μαζί" ("Better together")
2003 – 2004 season: "Βλέπω ANT1" ("I'm watching ANT1")
2004 – 2005 season: "Η ζωή θέλει ANT1" ("Life wants ANT1")
2005 – 2006 season: "Όλα παίζουν" ("Everything's possible")
2005 – 2006 season: "Δυνατά" ("Loud")
2006 – 2007 season: "Μη χάνεις στιγμή" ("Don't miss a moment")
2007 – 2008 season: "Βλέπεις καλά. είναι ΑΝΤ1." ("You see it right. It's ANT1.")
from 2008 until 2012: "Fresh"
from 2012 until 2014: "Τα ωραιότερα πράγματα στη ζωή, δεν είναι πράγματα." ("The most beautiful things in life, are not things.")
2014 – Summer 2015: "Όλοι εδώ" ("Everybody here")
Summer – Autumn 2015: "Καλοκαίρι εδώ" ("Summer here")
Autumn 2015 – Autumn 2017: ANT1
Autumn 2017 – Summer 2018: That's ANT1 ("Απίστευτο! Unbelievable!")
Summer – Autumn 2018: Ώρα για ANT1 ("Time for ANT1")
Autumn 2018 – present: Είμαστε Ένα ("We are one")
31 December 2019 – 31 December 2020: 30 Χρόνια Είμαστε Ένα ("30 years we are one")

Logos

References

External links
Official Site 
Antenna Europe 
Antenna Satellite 
Antenna Pacific 
Video from the reality show Mission broadcast and created from Ant1 channel

ANT1 Group
Greek-language television stations
Television channels and stations established in 1989
1989 establishments in Greece
Television networks in Greece
Television channels in Greece
Marousi